Bianchi cavalli d'Agosto (internationally known as White Horses of Summer) is a 1975 Italian drama film written and directed by Raimondo Del Balzo and starring Jean Seberg.

The film is part of the genre of Italian melodramatic films known as "tearjerker movies" or "lacrima movies". 
It also is, together with The Last Snows of Spring, the best known and successful film of child actor Renato Cestiè.

Cast 
Jean Seberg: Lea Kingsburg 
Frederick Stafford: Nicholas Kingsburg 
Renato Cestiè: Bunny 
Ciccio Ingrassia: The fisherman
Alberto Terracina: Aldo Tavani 
Antonino Faà di Bruno: Receptionist
Vanna Brosio: Nurse

References

External links

1975 films
Italian drama films
1975 drama films
English-language Italian films
Films scored by Franco Micalizzi
1970s English-language films
1970s Italian films